John Alexander McCone (January 4, 1902 – February 14, 1991) was an American businessman and politician who served as Director of Central Intelligence from 1961 to 1965, during the height of the Cold War.

Background 
John A. McCone was born in San Francisco, California, on January 4, 1902. His father ran iron foundries across California, a business founded in Nevada in 1860 by McCone's grandfather. He graduated from the University of California, Berkeley in 1922 with a BS in Mechanical Engineering, beginning his career in Los Angeles' Llewellyn Iron Works. He rose swiftly and in 1929, when several works merged to become the Consolidated Steel Corporation, he became executive vice president. He also founded Bechtel-McCone.

He also worked for ITT. In 1946, the General Accounting Office implied that McCone was a war profiteer, stating that McCone and his associates of the California Shipbuilding Corporation had made $44 million on an investment of $100,000. McCone's political affiliation was with the Republican Party.

McCone served for more than twenty years as a governmental adviser and official, including positions on the Atomic Energy Commission in the Eisenhower Administration in 1958–1961 and with the Central Intelligence Agency (CIA) in the Kennedy Administration and the Johnson Administration in 1961–1965.

However, it would be his service in 1950–1951, as the second United States Under Secretary of the Air Force, that McCone got his first taste of duty in the senior levels of the U.S. Government during the Truman Administration.

Atomic Energy Commission 
In 1958, he became chairman of the U.S. Atomic Energy Commission. According to journalist Seymour Hersh, in December 1960, while still Atomic Energy Commission chairman, McCone revealed CIA information about Israel's Dimona nuclear weapons plant to The New York Times.  Hersh writes that President John F. Kennedy was "fixated" on the Israeli nuclear weapons program and one of the reasons that contributed to McCone's appointment as CIA director was his willingness to deal with this and other nuclear weapons issues – and despite the fact that McCone was a conservative Republican.

Director of Central Intelligence

After the disaster of the Bay of Pigs Invasion, President John F. Kennedy forced the resignation of CIA director Allen Dulles and some of his staff. McCone replaced Dulles as DCI on November 29, 1961.

He married Theiline McGee Pigott on August 29, 1962, at St. Anne's Chapel of the Sacred Heart Villa in Seattle, Washington.

McCone was not Kennedy's first choice; the President had tentatively offered the job to Clark Clifford, his personal lawyer, who politely refused (Clifford would later serve as Secretary of Defense for Lyndon Johnson); and then to Fowler Hamilton, a Wall Street lawyer with experience in government service during the Roosevelt and Truman administrations. Hamilton accepted, but when a problem developed at the Agency for International Development, he was shifted there. Thus Kennedy, urged on by his brother Robert, turned to McCone.

McCone was a key figure in the Executive Committee of the National Security Council (EXCOMM) during the October 1962 Cuban Missile Crisis. In the Honeymoon telegram of September 20, 1962, he insisted that the CIA remain imaginative when it came to Soviet weapons policy towards Cuba, as a September 19 National Intelligence Estimate had concluded it unlikely that nuclear missiles would be placed on the island. The telegram was so named because McCone sent it while on his honeymoon in Paris, France, accompanied not only by his bride, Theiline McGee Pigott but by a CIA cipher team.

McCone's suspicions of the inaccuracy of this assessment proved to be correct, as it was later found out the Soviet Union had followed up its conventional military buildup with the installation of MRBMs (Medium Range Ballistic Missiles) and IRBMs (Intermediate Range Ballistic Missiles), sparking off the crisis in October when they were later spotted by CIA's Lockheed U-2 surveillance flights.

While McCone was DCI, the CIA was involved in many covert plots; according to Admiral Stansfield Turner (who himself later served as DCI from 1977 to 1981, under President Jimmy Carter), these included:

McCone was also involved in the 1964 Brazilian coup d'état; he was friends with ITT president Harold Geneen whose company stood to lose its Brazilian subsidiary if president João Goulart nationalized it. McCone would later work for ITT.

McCone represented the CIA's opposition to U.S. support of a coup in South Vietnam against President Ngo Dinh Diem, but such objections were overruled by November 1963, when the State Department managed to convince Kennedy to allow the coup to proceed.

In 1964, he was awarded the Hoover Medal.

McCone resigned from his position of DCI in April 1965, believing himself to be unappreciated by President Lyndon B. Johnson, who, he complained, would not read his reports, including on the need for full-fledged inspections of Israeli nuclear facilities. Before his resignation, McCone submitted a final memorandum regarding the war in Vietnam to President Johnson, arguing that Johnson's plan of attack was too limited in scope to successfully defeat the Hanoi regime; he further asserted that public support (in the United States and abroad) for any effort in North Vietnam would erode if the plan went unchanged:

Other 
Throughout his career, McCone served on numerous commissions that made recommendations on issues as diverse as civilian applications of military technology and the Watts Riots.

In 1987, McCone was presented with the Presidential Medal of Freedom by President Ronald Reagan.

Death 
John A. McCone died on February 14, 1991, of cardiac arrest at his home in Pebble Beach, California. He was 89 years old.

Honors and awards 
McCone Hall at the University of California, Berkeley campus is named in McCone's honor.

In popular culture 
McCone was portrayed in several different docudramas about the Cuban Missile Crisis, by Keene Curtis in the television production The Missiles of October (1974) and Peter White in the theatrical film Thirteen Days (2000). In the 2020 film  The Courier, he is played by Željko Ivanek. In the film X-Men: First Class (2011) he was played by Matt Craven. Metal Gear Solid 3: Snake Eater and its sequel, Metal Gear Solid: Portable Ops feature an unnamed DCI modeled physically after McCone.

See also
Bechtel Corporation

Notes

References
 
  Chapters 7–8, and pp. 321–322.
 Constructing Cassandra : the Social Construction of Strategic Surprise at the Central Intelligence Agency, 1947- 2001 https://catalogue.kent.ac.uk/Record/764718

External links
 Annotated Bibliography for John A. McCone from the Alsos Digital Library for Nuclear Issues
 Papers of John A. McCone, Dwight D. Eisenhower Presidential Library
 Guide to the John A. McCone Papers at The Bancroft Library
 
 Announcement of the Recipients of the Presidential Medal of Freedom
 FBI files on John McCone
 John McCone biography by chief CIA historian David Robarge

|-

|-

1902 births
1991 deaths
20th-century American businesspeople

American spies
Businesspeople from San Francisco
Chairmen of the United States Atomic Energy Commission
Directors of the Central Intelligence Agency
Eisenhower administration cabinet members
Place of death missing
Politicians from San Francisco
Presidential Medal of Freedom recipients
UC Berkeley College of Engineering alumni